The 37th Annual Tony Awards was held at the Gershwin Theatre on June 5, 1983, and broadcast by CBS television. Hosts were Richard Burton, Lena Horne, and Jack Lemmon.

The ceremony
Presenters included George Abbott, Diahann Carroll, David Cassidy, James Coco, Cleavant Derricks, Colleen Dewhurst, Sergio Franchi, Bonnie Franklin, Peter Michael Goetz, Mark Hamill, Cheryl Hartley, Florence Lacey, Frank Langella, Court Miller, Liliane Montevecchi, Jerry Orbach, Jay Patterson, John Rubinstein, and Pamela Sousa.

The Special Salute was a medley of George Gershwin songs. At the end of the ceremony the Uris Theatre was renamed the Gershwin Theatre. Songs included: "The Real American Folk Song" sung by Diahann Carroll, "Stairway to Paradise" sung by Ben Vereen, "Somebody Loves Me" sung by Jack Lemmon and Ginger Rogers, "Lady Be Good" sung by Hal Linden and Ginger Rogers, "Someone to Watch Over Me" sung by Melissa Manchester, "How Long Has This Been Going On?" sung by Bonnie Franklin, "Vodka" sung by Dorothy Loudon, "I Got Rhythm" sung by Michele Lee and "There's a Boat dat's Leavin' Soon For New York" sung by Robert Guillaume.

Musicals represented:
 Cats, "Jellicle Songs for Jellicle Cats" - Company/"Memory" - Betty Buckley
 Merlin, "It's About Magic" - Doug Henning, Company
 My One and Only, "Kicking the Clouds Away" - Tommy Tune, Company

Winners and nominees
Source: BroadwayWorld

Winners are in bold

Special awards
 Regional Theatre Award - Oregon Shakespeare Festival Association

Multiple nominations and awards

These productions received multiple nominations:

11 nominations: Cats 
9 nominations: My One and Only 
7 nominations: All's Well That Ends Well  
5 nominations: Merlin and On Your Toes 
4 nominations: Brighton Beach Memoirs, 'night, Mother and Plenty 
3 nominations: A Doll's Life, Foxfire, K2 and Show Boat  
2 nominations: Angels Fall, Porgy and Bess, Torch Song Trilogy and A View from the Bridge     

The following productions received multiple awards.

7 wins: Cats 
3 wins: My One and Only 
2 wins: Brighton Beach Memoirs, On Your Toes and Torch Song Trilogy

See also
 Drama Desk Awards
 1983 Laurence Olivier Awards – equivalent awards for West End theatre productions
 Obie Award
 New York Drama Critics' Circle
 Theatre World Award
 Lucille Lortel Awards

References

External links
 Official Site

Tony Awards ceremonies
1983 in theatre
1983 theatre awards
1983 in New York City
Tony